Nizhny Avzyan (Tübänge Äwjän) is a rural locality (a selo) in Kaginsky Selsoviet, Beloretsky District, Bashkortostan, Russia. The population was 143 as of 2010. There are 6 streets.

Geography 
Nizhny Avzyan is located 86 km southwest of Beloretsk (the district's administrative centre) by road. Verkhny Avzyan is the nearest rural locality.

References 

Rural localities in Beloretsky District